John Albert Pittman (October 15, 1928 – April 8, 1995) was a soldier in the United States Army during the Korean War. He received the Medal of Honor for his actions on November 26, 1950, during the Battle of the Ch'ongch'on River.

He is buried in New Hope Cemetery, Carroll County, Mississippi.

Medal of Honor citation
Rank and organization: Sergeant, U.S. Army, Company C, 23rd Infantry Regiment, 2nd Infantry Division

Place and date: Near Kujangdong, Korea, November 26, 1950

Entered service at: Carrollton, Mississippi Born: October 15, 1928, Carrollton, Mississippi

G.O. No.: 39, June 4, 1951

Citation:

Sgt. Pittman, distinguished himself by conspicuous gallantry and intrepidity above and beyond the call of duty in action against the enemy. He volunteered to lead his squad in a counterattack to regain commanding terrain lost in an earlier engagement. Moving aggressively forward in the face of intense artillery, mortar, and small-arms fire he was wounded by mortar fragments. Disregarding his wounds he continued to lead and direct his men in a bold advance against the hostile standpoint. During this daring action, an enemy grenade was thrown in the midst of his squad endangering the lives of his comrades. Without hesitation, Sgt. Pittman threw himself on the grenade and absorbed its burst with his body. When a medical aid man reached him, his first request was to be informed as to how many of his men were hurt. This intrepid and selfless act saved several of his men from death or serious injury and was an inspiration to the entire command. Sgt. Pittman's extraordinary heroism reflects the highest credit upon himself and is in keeping with the esteemed traditions of the military service.

See also

List of Medal of Honor recipients
List of Korean War Medal of Honor recipients

References

External links

1928 births
1995 deaths
United States Army soldiers
United States Army personnel of the Korean War
Korean War recipients of the Medal of Honor
United States Army Medal of Honor recipients
People from Carrollton, Mississippi